The 1959 Milan–San Remo was the 50th edition of the Milan–San Remo cycle race and was held on 19 March 1959. The race started in Milan and finished in San Remo. The race was won by Miguel Poblet.

General classification

References

1959
1959 in road cycling
1959 in Italian sport
March 1959 sports events in Europe